Bangkok Jazz Festival is a jazz festival in Bangkok, Thailand. The festival was established in 2003 in commemoration of the King Bhumibol Adulyadej of Thailand who was is said to have a passion for jazz. It takes place at Sanam Suea Pa in Dusit District. It is usually held for three nights in December, where a number of internationally known artists perform at the festival. The festival attracts around 30,000 people each year.

References

Jazz festivals in Thailand
2003 establishments in Thailand
Culture of Bangkok
Music festivals established in 2003
Music festivals in Thailand